William Hurton (1825–1862) was an English author and journalist living in Edinburgh, best known for his tales of arctic travel. Hurton's story Vonved the Dane, Count of Elsinore, serialized in The Dublin Magazine in 1860, caught the attention of William Makepeace Thackeray, who wrote to Hurton asking him to call.

Major works
A Voyage from Leith to Lapland or: Pictures from Scandinavia in 1850, London, R. Bentley, 2nd Revised Edition 1852.
Visit to an Encampment of Laplanders, Harper’s New Monthly Magazine, 1852
The Doomed Ship: or, The Wreck of the Arctic Regions, embellished with sixteen engravings, by Watts Phillips, London : Willoughby & Co., 1856
Vonved the Dane, Count of Elsinore, serialized in The Dublin Magazine in 1860, published anonymously in book form in 1861
Hearts of Oak, or Naval yarns. By the author of "Vonved the Dane". London: Richard Bentley, 1862 (originally published in the Dublin University Magazine)

References

19th-century English writers
Writers from Edinburgh
19th-century British male writers
1825 births
1862 deaths